The German Forum Party was an opposition political party in East Germany. It was formed from the New Forum (Neues Forum) citizens' movement. It was founded in Karl-Marx-Stadt (now Chemnitz) on 27 January 1990. Its first chairman was Jürgen Schmieder. It described itself as being at the political centre.

It was invited to join the Christian Democrat-dominated Alliance for Germany coalition for the 1990 Volkskammer election but instead it joined the Association of Free Democrats on 12 February 1990.

See also
Liberalism
Contributions to liberal theory
Liberalism worldwide
List of liberal parties
Liberal democracy
Liberalism in Germany

External links
German Forum Party from Chronik der Wende

Germany 1990
Organizations of the Revolutions of 1989
Political parties in East Germany
Political parties established in 1990
1990 establishments in East Germany
Peaceful Revolution